Pterostylis aestiva, commonly known as the long-tongued summer greenhood, is a species of orchid endemic to south-eastern Australia. As with similar greenhoods, the flowering plants differ from those which are not flowering. The non-flowering plants have a rosette of leaves flat on the ground but the flowering plants have a single flower with leaves on the flowering spike.

Description
The flowers are dark bluish-green, white and brown. The dorsal sepal and petals are fused, forming a hood or "galea" over the column. Flowering occurs from January to April.

Taxonomy and naming 
Pterostylis aestiva was first formally described in 1972 by David Jones from a specimen collected near Wulgulmerang. The description was published in Muelleria. The specific epithet (aestiva) is a Latin word meaning "pertaining to summer".

Distribution and habitat
The long-tongued summer greenhood grows among grasses in high rainfall forests in north-east Victoria and New South Wales as far north as Mount Canobolas.

Use in horticulture
This greenhood is easily grows in pots although plants must be kept moist during the growing season and dry when dormant.

References

aestiva
Endemic orchids of Australia
Orchids of New South Wales
Orchids of Victoria (Australia)
Plants described in 1972